The Neckartal Dam, nicknamed the Desert Dragon, is a dam located in the ǁKaras Region of southern Namibia. Construction started in 2013 and was initially expected to finish in 2017. Since its completion in 2018, it is the largest dam in Namibia, more than three times the capacity of the Hardap Dam upstream. The dam's purpose is to support a  irrigation scheme nearby.

Construction
The idea to construct a dam near Keetmanshoop already came up during the German colonialisation. Upon Namibian independence in 1990, the planning slowly started. Although hailed as a promising job creation project, particularly after commission due to the purpose as an irrigation dam, there were doubts over the necessity to build it. Naute Dam in the same area, likewise an irrigation dam, is under-utilised.

Italian company Salini Impregilo was awarded the 2.8 billion N$ tender to build the dam in March 2012. After a legal challenge by one competitor, the tender was withdrawn but reawarded to the same company in August 2013. Construction started it within a month. Originally planned to take 3 years, the project has been delayed by a court case and labour unrest. Its completion occurred in October 2018, after which the filling-up phase was expected to last another two years. The dam overflowed for the first time on 19 January 2021.

Building process

References

Keetmanshoop
Dams in Namibia
Buildings and structures in ǁKaras Region